Jesús López Cobos (25 February 1940 – 2 March 2018) was a Spanish conductor.

Early life and career 
López Cobos was born in Toro, Zamora, Spain. He studied at Complutense University of Madrid and graduated with a degree in philosophy. Later he studied conducting with Franco Ferrara and with Hans Swarowsky at the University of Music and Performing Arts Vienna.

From 1981 to 1990 he was general music director of the Deutsche Oper Berlin and from 1984 to 1988 he was music director of the Orquesta Nacional de España. From 1986 to 2001 he served as music director of the Cincinnati Symphony Orchestra, and from 1990 to 2000 he was principal conductor of the Orchestre de Chambre de Lausanne. From 2003 to 2010 he served as music director of the Teatro Real in Madrid.
He was a National Patron of Delta Omicron, an international professional music fraternity.

López Cobos was managed by London-based agency Intermusica.

Death 
López Cobos died in Berlin, Germany, on 2 March 2018, age 78 of cancer-related causes.

Awards 
 1981 Prince of Asturias Award for the Arts.

Premieres

See also 
 Lopez Cobos International Opera Conductors Competition

References

External links 

 
 Jésus López Cobos at the Prince of Asturias Foundation website
 Short biography
 Interview with Jesús López Cobos, August 1, 1997

1940 births
2018 deaths
Spanish conductors (music)
Male conductors (music)
Music directors (opera)
University of Music and Performing Arts Vienna alumni
Complutense University of Madrid alumni
Prize-winners of the International Besançon Competition for Young Conductors
20th-century Spanish musicians
20th-century conductors (music)
21st-century Spanish musicians
21st-century conductors (music)
Officers Crosses of the Order of Merit of the Federal Republic of Germany
20th-century Spanish male musicians
21st-century male musicians
Erato Records artists
People from the Province of Zamora